Plymouth Southside Historic District is a national historic district located at Plymouth, Marshall County, Indiana.  The district encompasses 91 contributing buildings, 2 contributing structures, and 1 contributing object in a predominantly residential section of Plymouth.  It developed between about 1853 and 1953, and includes examples of Italianate, Greek Revival, Queen Anne, Colonial Revival, and Tudor Revival style architecture.  Notable contributing resources include the John McFarlin, Jr., House (c. 1860), Trinity United Methodist Church (1926), Bible Baptist Church (1894), Felke Florist and Greenhouse (1922), John Soice Residence (c. 1875), Westervelt-Marble Residence (c. 1865, 1899), and Edwards-Gambel Residence (1856).

It was listed on the National Register of Historic Places in 2013.

See also
East Laporte Street Footbridge
Marshall County Courthouse (Indiana)
Plymouth Downtown Historic District
Plymouth Northside Historic District
Plymouth Southside Historic District
Plymouth Fire Station

References

Historic districts on the National Register of Historic Places in Indiana
Greek Revival architecture in Indiana
Colonial Revival architecture in Indiana
Tudor Revival architecture in Indiana
Italianate architecture in Indiana
Queen Anne architecture in Indiana
Historic districts in Marshall County, Indiana
National Register of Historic Places in Marshall County, Indiana